(), also known in English as Remember When, is a Greek prime-time television drama series which has been broadcast on ERT1 since 15 October 2020. It recounts the experiences of the Antonopoulos family during the Regime of the Colonels, the Greek transition to democracy and the first years of the democratic Third Hellenic Republic.

Development
The series is an adaptation of Cuéntame cómo pasó, a Spanish series by Televisión Española starring Imanol Arias and Ana Duato.

The first episode was broadcast on 15 October 2020. The series begins in July 1969 with the arrival of television to the house of the Antonopoulos just in time to watch the moon landing of Apollo 11. The story reflects the changes in Greece since then.

Plot 
Stelios and Maria are a married couple that have emigrated in the 1960s from a small village in Messenia, to a working-class suburb in Athens, along with her mother Ermioni and their three children, Elpida, Antonis and Angelos seeking a better life away from the hardships of an impoverished countryside.

The Antonopoulos' story is narrated from an indefinite present by an adult Angelos. Their story is directly and indirectly affected by the events and the social, economical and political changes occurring in Greece from the late 1960s until the early 1980s.

Cast
The cast of the series is led by those of the Antonopoulos family:
  as Maria Antonopoulou
  as Stelios Antonopoulos
  as Ermioni
  as Nana
 Erifyli Kitzoglou as Elpida Antonopoulou
 Dimitris Kapouranis as Antonis Antonopoulos
 Manolis Gkinis as Angelos Antonopoulos
 Vassilis Charalampopoulos as the voice of adult Angelos Antonopoulos

Episodes

References

External links 
  
 Official production website
 Ta Kalytera mas Chronia at ERTflix
 

Hellenic Broadcasting Corporation original programming
2020 Greek television series debuts
Television series set in the 1960s
Television series set in the 1970s
Television series set in the 1980s
Television shows set in Athens